Alberto Bourdillón (born 13 March 1943) is an Argentine former swimmer. He competed in the men's 4 × 100 metre medley relay at the 1964 Summer Olympics.

References

1943 births
Living people
Argentine male swimmers
Olympic swimmers of Argentina
Swimmers at the 1964 Summer Olympics
Place of birth missing (living people)
20th-century Argentine people